The Penta Cup International (also known as the Novarat Trophy and Danubius Thermal Trophy) was an international figure skating competition in Hungary. It formed the Donaupokal (Danube Cup) along with Austria's Karl Schäfer Memorial. Medals were awarded in the disciplines of men's singles, ladies' singles, and ice dancing on the senior and junior levels. In 1987, the competition was held in November.

Senior medalists

Men

Ladies

Ice dancing

Junior medalists

Men

Ladies

Ice dancing

References 

International figure skating competitions hosted by Hungary